"Fire" by Ferry Corsten is a trance song that was released as a single in 2005, as well as appearing on Ferry Corsten's 2006 album L.E.F. It features vocals by Simon Le Bon (of the popular 80's band Duran Duran) from the 1990 song "Serious" by Duran Duran, which were re-recorded by Le Bon rather than sampled from the original song. A compilation of eight different remixes, also called "Fire", was released in 2006. The song received wide play throughout Europe through 2006 on commercial radio stations.

Music video 
The music video features a woman in a block of ice being defrosted by Ferry Corsten using a Gas axe. The video also features extracts from Duran Duran's video for the song "Serious". The extracts feature LeBon close up performing the lyrics that form the main body of "Fire".

Charts

Weekly charts

Year-end charts

References

External links 
 Music Video on Youtube

2005 singles
2005 songs
Songs written by Nick Rhodes
Songs written by Sterling Campbell
Songs written by Warren Cuccurullo
Songs written by Simon Le Bon
Songs written by John Taylor (bass guitarist)
Songs written by Ferry Corsten